Kathleen Wharton (née Keremete; born 26 August 1983) is a New Zealand rugby league footballer who played as  for the New Zealand Warriors in the NRL Women's Premiership. 

A New Zealand international, she represented her country at the 2008 and 2013 Women's Rugby League World Cups.

Playing career
In 2008, Wharton was a member of New Zealand's 2008 Women's Rugby League World Cup-winning squad.

Following the World Cup, Wharton retired to focus on her career and raise her family.

In 2019, Wharton returned to rugby league, representing the Māori All Stars in their 8–4 win over the Indigenous All Stars. On 22 June 2019, she represented New Zealand for the first time in six years, scoring a try in their 46–8 win over Samoa in Auckland.

On 10 July 2019, she signed with the New Zealand Warriors NRL Women's Premiership team. In Round 1 of the 2019 NRL Women's season, she made her debut for the Warriors in a 16–12 win over the Sydney Roosters. 

References

External links
NRL profile
NZRL profile

1983 births
Living people
New Zealand Māori rugby league players
New Zealand female rugby league players
New Zealand women's national rugby league team players
Rugby league second-rows
Rugby league locks
New Zealand Warriors (NRLW) players